Supplanaxis niger is a species of sea snail, a marine gastropod mollusk in the family Planaxidae.

Description
The length of the shell attains 13 mm, its diameter 7.7 mm.

(Original description of Planaxis abbreviata ogasawarana Pilsbry, 1905)) The shell is larger and longer than Planaxis abbreviata Pease (synonym of Supplanaxis niger (Quoy & Gaimard, 1833)), ovate-conic, thick and solid, chocolate-brown, the body whorl covered with a dull fibrous cuticle. Sculpture of spiral grooves, often weak in the middle of the body  whorl, strong below the suture and at the base. The shell contains about 6 convex whorls. The aperture is oblique, the outer lip is thickened within, and bearing 11 to 14 lirae, which extend into the throat. The basal and posterior notches are  small, deep and rounded.

Distribution
This marine species occurs off Madagascar, Japan and Papua New Guinea.

References

 Poppe G.T., Tagaro S.P. & Stahlschmidt P. (2015). New shelled molluscan species from the central Philippines I. Visaya. 4(3): 15–59.
 Hasegawa K. (2017). Family Planaxidae. Pp. 794-795, in: T. Okutani (ed.), Marine Mollusks in Japan, ed. 2. 2 vols. Tokai University Press. 1375 pp.

External links
 Quoy, J.C.R. & Gaimard, P. (1833) Mollusques. In Dumont d’Urville, M.J. (Ed.) Voyage de Découverts de l’Astrolabe, Éxécuté par Ordre du Roi Pendant les Années 1826–1827–1828–1829, sous le Commandement de M. J. Dumont d' Urville. Zoologie, Tome 2. J. Tatsu
 Smith, E. A. (1872). A list of the species of the genus Planaxis, with descriptions of eleven new species. Annals and Magazine of Natural History. ser. 4, 9: 37-47
 Pease, W. H. (1869). Description of new species of marine Gasteropodæ inhabiting Polynesia. American Journal of Conchology. 5: 64-79
 Pease, W. H. (1865). Descriptions of new genera and species of marine shells from the islands of the Central Pacific. Proceedings of the Zoological Society of London. (1865): 512-517
 Dunker, W. & Zelebor, J. (1866). Bericht über die von der Novara-Expedition mitgebrachten Mollusken. Verhandlungen der Kaiserlich-Königlichen Zoologisch-Botanischen Gesellschaft in Wien. 16: 909-916.

Planaxidae
Gastropods described in 1833